This is a list of Austrian football transfers for the 2021–22 winter transfer window. Only transfers featuring Austrian Football Bundesliga are listed.

Austrian Football Bundesliga

Note: Flags indicate national team as has been defined under FIFA eligibility rules. Players may hold more than one non-FIFA nationality.

Red Bull Salzburg

In:

Out:

Rapid Wien

In:

Out:

Sturm Graz

In:

Out:

LASK

In:

Out:

Wolfsberg

In:

Out:

WSG Tirol

In:

Out:

Hartberg

In:

Out:

Austria Wien

In:

Out:

Ried

In:

Out:

SCR Altach

In:

Out:

Admira Wacker

In:

Out:

Austria Klagenfurt

In:

Out:

See also
 2021–22 Austrian Football Bundesliga

References

External links
 Official site of the ÖFB
 Official site of the Bundesliga

Football transfers winter 2021–22
Transfers
2021-22